Cyrus S. W. Anderson is a former American college baseball coach. Anderson coached the Tennessee Volunteers baseball team from 1948 to 1952, leading the Volunteers to a runner-up finish in the 1951 College World Series.

Playing career
Anderson enjoyed a 12-year career in professional baseball. He spent the 1924 season with the Memphis Chickasaws, who would win 104 games.

Head coaching record

References

External links

Chattanooga Lookouts players
Memphis Chickasaws players
Wilkes-Barre Barons (baseball) players
Mobile Bears players
Williamsport Grays players
Norfolk Tars players
Charleston Senators players
Tennessee Volunteers baseball coaches